Hit the Top is a South Korean television series starring Yoon Shi-yoon, Lee Se-young, Kim Min-jae and Cha Tae-hyun. The drama aired on KBS2, from June 2 to July 22, 2017, on Fridays and Saturdays at 23:00 (KST) for 32 episodes.

Hit the Top is the first drama directed by Yoo Ho-jin, who directed the third season of variety show 2 Days & 1 Night; and the directorial debut of Cha Tae-hyun, who also co-starred.

Synopsis
In the year 1993, pop idol Yoo Hyun-Jae accidentally travels through time to 2017. Discovering that he mysteriously disappears in 1994 and is presumed dead, he begins to investigate into the reason for his disappearance while trying to adjust to life in the future. Meanwhile, Lee Ji-Hoon is an aspiring musician and is secretly enrolled as an idol trainee at Star Punch Entertainment. Ji-hoon struggles to hide this from his parents, who believe he has been studying for his civil service exams.

Cast

Main
Yoon Shi-yoon as Yoo Hyun-jae
A popular Korean pop idol from the 1990s and the lead partner of performing duo J2. Known for his good looks, talent, and controversies, he accidentally time travels to 2017 and helplessly tries to adjust to the modern way of living. Lee Ji Hoon's biological father.  
Lee Se-young as Choi Woo-seung
A cheerful, perky student who is also preparing with Lee Ji-hoon for the civil exam. After finding out about her boyfriend's infidelity with her roommate, she reluctantly moves in to Ji-hoon's apartment.
Kim Min-jae as Lee Ji-hoon 
He is Lee Gwang-jae's foster child. Despite preparing to take a civil service exam, he is secretly struggling to become an idol at Star Punch Entertainment. It is later revealed that he is the son of Yoo Hyun-jae and Hong Bo-hee.
Cha Tae-hyun as Lee Gwang-jae
Lee Ji-hoon's adoptive father and World Planning Entertainment's CEO. Currently running a desolate management firm, he used to be Yoo Hyun-jae's hotshot manager. For years, he has harbored a one-sided love for Hong Bo-hee.

Supporting

World Entertainment

Yoon Son-ha as Hong Bo-hee
Lee Ji-hoon's mother. Once a very famous K-pop singer in the 90s, her controversial relationship with Hyun-jae has led to her career's demise and now manages a bakery adjacent to the firm. She continuously tries to make a comeback to the entertainment industry.
 as MC Drill
An aspiring rapper who secretly lives with best friend Ji-hoon at the latter's loft. A fellow idol trainee at Star Punch, he also harbors a secretive past, such as his military enlistment.
Lee Deok-hwa as Lee Soon-tae
President of Entertainment Management Association and the chairman of World Entertainment who ceaselessly tries to fund it despite its dismal state.

Star Punch Entertainment

Hong Kyung-min as Park Young-jae
The other half of J2 who was constantly overshadowed by his duo partner Hyun-jae. He currently manages Star Punch Entertainment using the latter's lost musical works that he secretly keeps in his office.
Im Ye-jin as Cathy
Chairwoman of Star Punch who is constantly critical of Young-jae.
Cha Eun-woo as MJ
One of Star Punch's popular idols, and a frequent recipient of works from Hyun-jae's lost musical material, which he is forced to claim as his own.
Bona as Do Hye-ri
An idol trainee who is on the brink of debuting. However, she is always pressured by her weight and appearance which keeps her from being presented to the music scene.

Others

 as Mal-sook
Lee Jung-min as Heol-re 
Son Soo-min as Beol-ddeok 
Choi Seung-hoon as Shin Hwa
Kim Seung-hyun
Lim Sung-min
Kim Ji-hyun
Choi Ri-yoon
Ha Nam-woo
Lim Ji-seob
Kim Tae-bin
Hong Seok-yoon
Lee Ha-na
Yoon Sun-ah
Choi Jung-eun
Lim Yoo-mi 
Yoon Kab-soo
Kim Young-hee
Lee Sung-hoon
Gong Min-gyu
Kim Yong-jae
Kim Ji-eun
Han Hyong-gyu
Lee Young-rae
Choi Nam-uk
Kim Do-yoon
Nam Seung-woo
Lee Ri-na
Ryu Ba
Uk Sa-na
Park Mi-hyo
Choi Seul-gi
Ko Jin-myung
Seo Hee
Kim Ji-yeon
Jo Moon-young
Kim Hyong-gyu
Kwon Hyuk
Seo Hye-jin
Choi Jung-eun
Ahn Nyu-mi
Lee Soo-min
Choi Yoo-sol
Min Do-hee

Special appearances

Kim Byung-chan
 as Gayo Top 10 MC (Ep. 1)
Ko Chang-seok as Photographer (Ep. 1)
Shin Seung-hwan as Noryangjin Academy Instructor (Ep. 1)
Kim Sook as Kim Sook, a student and one of MJ's fans (Ep. 1–3, 8, 17–18)
Shorry J as Soo-jin, an ex-Star Punch Entertainment trainee (Ep. 1)
Park Hyuk-kwon as Director Park (Ep. 1, 7)
Choi Hwa-jung as herself, radio DJ (Ep. 1–2)
Kim Jun-ho as a karaoke customer (Ep. 1) / doctor (Ep. 3)
 as a karaoke customer (Ep. 1) / car crash victim (Ep. 2)
 as reporter
Lee Kwang-soo as Yoon-gi, Choi Woo-seung's ex-boyfriend (Ep. 1–2)
 as Choi Woo-seung's roommate (Ep. 1–2, 25)
Ahn Gil-kang as a criminal suspect (Ep. 2)
Choi Kwon as policeman interrogating Choi Woo-seung (Ep. 2)
 Defconn as himself (Ep. 3) 
Jang Hyuk (Ep. 3)
 WJSN as Star Punch trainees (Ep. 4)
 Monsta X as themselves (Ep. 4)
 Kwon Ki-jong as a food delivery man/referee (Ep. 5)
 Lee Yoo-jong
 Kim Dong-hyeon as music producer at Star Punch Entertainment (Ep. 7)
  as Challenge Music Star (TV show) host (Ep. 7–8)
 Kim Jong-min (Ep. 8)
  as MC at talent show (Ep. 10)
 Lee Soon-jae as man at the convenience store
 Yoon Ji-on as Detective
 Kan Mi-youn as Ha Soo-young (Ep. 16)
  as a phishing scammer (Ep. 21)
  as Chairwoman Oh of Jongno Entertainment (Ep. 25, 28)

Episodes

Production
Hit the Top is the second "variety-drama" produced by KBS after The Producers in 2015. It is produced by director Seo Soo-min, who is currently the chief producer for KBS's Happy Sunday programming block and the former PD of the now-defunct program Gag Concert. Seo also worked on a few episodes of The Producers.

Chorokbaem Media, the company behind The Producers, was tapped to produce Hit the Top for KBS.  Sitcom writer Lee Young-chul (Potato Star 2013QR3, High Kick! and Once Upon a Time in Saengchori) is penning the script. The first script reading took place on April 3, 2017, in Sangam-dong, Seoul, South Korea.

Original soundtrack

Part 1

Part 2

Part 3

Part 4

Part 5

Part 6

Part 7

Part 8

Ratings 
In the table below,  represent the lowest ratings and  represent the highest ratings.
NR denotes that the drama did not rank in the top 20 daily programs on that date.

Awards and nominations

Notes

References

External links
 

 
 
 Website
 Hit the Top at Chorokbaem Media

2017 South Korean television series debuts
Korean Broadcasting System television dramas
Korean-language television shows
South Korean comedy-drama television series
South Korean time travel television series
Television series set in 1993
Television series set in 2017
Television series by Chorokbaem Media
2017 South Korean television series endings
South Korean musical television series
Television series by Monster Union